{{Infobox person
| name               = Jay Ilagan
| image              = Jay Ilagan, 'Coed' 1979.jpg
| image_caption      = Ilagan in the 1976 film, 'Minsa'y Isang Gamu-gamo| birth_date         = 
| birth_place        = Manila, Philippines
| death_date         = 
| death_place        = Quezon City, Philippines
| resting_place      = Loyola Memorial Park, Marikina, Metro Manila
| years_active       = 1964–1992
| birth_name         = Julius Angel Abad Ilagan
| other names = 
| occupation         = Actor
| spouse             = Hilda Koronel (separated)Amy Austria (partner until his death)
}}

Julius Angel Abad Ilagan (January 20, 1955 – February 4, 1992) was a Filipino actor. He hosted Stop, Look and Listen and starred in My Son, My Son and Goin' Bananas, and starred and participated in a number of movies.

Born Julius Abad Ilagan on January 20, 1955, his good looks eventually made him a matinee idol, starring in the films Maruja (1967), Tubog Sa Ginto (1970), Pinoy Crazy Boys (1974), and Hinog Sa Pilit. And because the looks came with deep talent, Jay survived the transition from teen star to adult actor - winning a Gawad Urian Best Supporting Actor trophy in 1982 for the movie, Kisapmata, another Gawad Urian Best Actor in 1985 for his role in Sister Stella L., and 1988 FAMAS and Film Academy of the Philippines Best Actor for his acting in Maging Akin Ka Lamang''.

His acting range was versatile as he has also appeared in a number of comedy movies and TV shows alongside critically-acclaimed dramatic films.

Personal life
The son of Sampaguita star Corazon Noble and director Angel Esmeralda started out as a child actor, originally using "Angel" as his screenname. He was married to fellow actor, Hilda Koronel, they eventually separated, and he and another fellow actor Amy Austria would live-in together. Jay had remained with Amy until his sudden death on February 4, 1992.

Filmography

Movies

Television

Death
On February 4, 1992 in Quezon City, Jay’s motorcycle was hit from behind by a drunk driver who was arguing with his girlfriend which resulted in him being thrown off and falling head first. He died due to the severity of his injuries. He was not wearing a protective helmet. He was 37 years old.

References

External links
 

1952 births
1992 deaths
20th-century Filipino male actors
Burials at the Loyola Memorial Park
Filipino male child actors
Male actors from Manila
Motorcycle road incident deaths
Road incident deaths in the Philippines